Erin Boley is an American women's basketball player with the Oregon Ducks women's basketball team at the University of Oregon. In 2016, while a student-athlete at Elizabethtown High School, she was named the Gatorade High School Basketball Player of the Year. Boley began her career at Notre Dame as a freshman, in 2016. She then transferred to Oregon the following year for the 2017–2018 season but had to sit out a year due to transfer rules.

Notre Dame and Oregon statistics 

Source

References

Year of birth missing (living people)
Living people
American women's 3x3 basketball players
American women's basketball players
Basketball players from Kentucky
Elizabethtown High School alumni
Notre Dame Fighting Irish women's basketball players
Oregon Ducks women's basketball players
People from Hodgenville, Kentucky